The 2018–19 season is the 46th season of competitive association football in Libya.

Promotion and relegation

Preseason

National teams

Libya national football team

2019 Africa Cup of Nations qualifications

Group E

CAF Competitions

2018–19 CAF Champions League

Qualifying rounds

Preliminary round

|}

First qualifying round

|}

2018–19 CAF Confederation Cup

Qualifying rounds

Preliminary round

|}

First round

|}

Play-off round

|}

Regular season

League season

Libyan Premier League

Group 1

Group 2

References